Monique Marie Allen (born 10 November 1971) is an Australian retired Olympic gymnast.

Allen joined the Australian Institute of Sport before participating in the 1990 Commonwealth Games in Auckland, where she earned 9.875 points on the uneven bars, making her the first Australian female gymnast to receive a gold medal.

References

External links
 

1971 births
Living people
Australian female artistic gymnasts
Olympic gymnasts of Australia
Place of birth missing (living people)
Gymnasts at the 1988 Summer Olympics
Gymnasts at the 1992 Summer Olympics
Commonwealth Games medallists in gymnastics
Commonwealth Games gold medallists for Australia
Commonwealth Games silver medallists for Australia
Commonwealth Games bronze medallists for Australia
Gymnasts at the 1990 Commonwealth Games
20th-century Australian women
Medallists at the 1990 Commonwealth Games